The Welfare Party (RP) was an Islamist political party in Turkey. It was founded by Ali Türkmen, Ahmet Tekdal, and Necmettin Erbakan in Ankara in 1983 as heir to two earlier parties, National Order Party (MNP) and National Salvation Party (MSP), which were banned from politics. The RP participated in mayoral elections at that time and won in three cities Konya, Şanlıurfa, and Van. Their vote percentage was approximately 5%.

The Welfare Party participated in the 1991 elections in a triple alliance with the Nationalist Movement Party (MHP) and the Reformist Democracy Party (IDP). They gained 16.9% of the vote. They won 62 deputies to parliament, but 19 deputies of MHP (with founding Democratic Movement Party on 25 December 1991 and joining the MÇP on 29 December 1991) and 3 of IDP left the Welfare Party after the election. Their popular vote increased over the years until they became the largest party under Prime Minister Necmettin Erbakan in 1996. The coalition government of Erbakan was forced out of power by the Turkish military in 1997, due to being suspected of having an Islamist agenda.

In 1998, the Welfare Party was banned from politics by the Constitutional Court of Turkey for violating the separation of religion and state. The ban was upheld by the European Court of Human Rights (ECtHR) on 13 February 2003. The ECtHR's decision was criticized by Human Rights Watch for lack of consistency, as the ECtHR had refused disbanding of other parties on several occasions, but the ECtHR defended its decision.

The incumbent president, Recep Tayyip Erdoğan, was a former member of the party. After being banned from politics for a period, he left this Islamist group and founded the Justice and Development Party (AKP). Abdullah Gül, the former President of Turkey, was the deputy leader of the Welfare Party until its dissolution.

Lost Trillion Case

After the closure of the party, the Treasury demanded the return of grants worth around one trillion lira, i.e. one million  in today's currency (around  99,796). Party officials stated that the funds were spent on party activities. However, an investigation revealed that the official documents were forged.

In the beginning of 1999, Necmettin Erbakan and 78 party officials stood trial in Ankara for embezzlement charges. The case became known as the "Lost Trillion Case" or the "Missing Trillion Case". In March 2002, the court sentenced Erbakan to two years and four months in prison. 68 party officials received sentences of up to one year and two months in prison. The sentences were approved by the Supreme Court of Appeals. The European Court of Human Rights upheld the ban as well.

Election results

Grand National Assembly

References

External links
 ECHR Third Section judgment (2001)
 ECHR Grand Chamber judgment (2003)

 
Defunct political parties in Turkey
Banned Islamist parties in Turkey
Defunct far-right parties in Turkey
Political parties established in 1983
Defunct Islamic organizations
Article 11 of the European Convention on Human Rights
European Court of Human Rights cases involving Turkey
1983 establishments in Turkey
Political parties disestablished in 1998
1998 disestablishments in Turkey
Recep Tayyip Erdoğan
Islamic organizations established in 1983